Atractus zebrinus is a species of snake in the family Colubridae. The species can be found in Brazil.

References 

Atractus
Endemic fauna of Brazil
Reptiles of Brazil
Reptiles described in 1862
Taxa named by Giorgio Jan